This is a list of Slovak football transfers in the winter transfer window 2014–15 by club. Only transfers of the Fortuna Liga are included.

Fortuna Liga

MŠK Žilina

In:

Out:

FK AS Trenčín

In:

Out:

FK Senica

In:

Out:

Spartak Myjava

In:

Out:

ŠK Slovan Bratislava

In:

Out:

FC Spartak Trnava

In:

Out:

MFK Košice

In:

Out:

FO ŽP Šport Podbrezová

In:

Out:

FC DAC 1904 Dunajská Streda

In:

Out:

FC ViOn Zlaté Moravce

In:

Out:

MFK Ružomberok

In:

Out:

FK Dukla Banská Bystrica

In:

Out:

See also
 2014–15 Fortuna Liga

References

External links
 Official site 
 Official site of the SFZ 
 Profutbal.sk 
 Sport.sk 

Transfers
2014-15
Slovak